The Dog (also known as Storyville: The Great Sex Addict Heist) is a 2013 documentary film co-written and co-directed by Allison Berg and Frank Keraudren, about the real-life story of bisexual bank robber John Wojtowicz that inspired the 1975 Al Pacino movie Dog Day Afternoon about his August 1972 attempted heist and 14-hour televised hostage situation in Brooklyn to pay for his lover's sex-reassignment surgery.

The film premiered at the 2013 Toronto International Film Festival.

Cast

Reception
After ten years in the making, The Dog premiered at the Toronto International Film Festival in September 2013.

Will Dean, TV reviewer of The Independent, noted that "Allison Berg and Frank Keraudren have done a fine job", of presenting a complex and diverse story of John Wojtowicz's life.

References

External links
 

2013 films
American heist films
Crime films based on actual events
Documentaries about historical events
2013 documentary films
American LGBT-related films
2013 LGBT-related films
2010s English-language films
American documentary films
2010s American films